The Act Prohibiting the Return of Slaves is a law passed by the United States Congress during the American Civil War forbidding all officers or persons in the military or naval service to return escaped former slaves to their owners with the aid or use of the forces under their respective commands.

As Union armies entered Southern territory during the early years of the War, emboldened slaves began fleeing behind Union lines to secure their freedom. Some commanders put the escapees to work digging entrenchments, building fortifications, and performing other camp work. Such former slaves came to be called "contraband", a term emphasizing their status as captured enemy property. Other Army commanders returned the escapees to their owners. Congress reacted by approving this act which requires that any officer that violates the same to be dismissed from the service upon conviction by a court-martial.

Text of the act
"An act to make an additional article of war" was approved March 13, 1862, with the following wording:Be it enacted by the Senate and House of Representatives of the United States of America in Congress assembled, That hereafter the following shall be promulgated as an additional article of war for the government of the army of the United States, and shall be obeyed and observed as such:

 ––. All officers or persons in the military or naval service of the United States are prohibited from employing any of the forces under their respective commands for the purpose of returning fugitives from service or labor, who may have escaped from any persons to whom such service or labor is claimed to be due, and any officer who shall be found guilty by a court-martial of violating this article shall be dismissed from the service.

 And be it further enacted, That this act shall take effect from and after its passage.

See also 
 Emancipation Proclamation
 Confiscation Act of 1861
 Contraband (American Civil War)
 Slave Trade Act

References

Politics of the American Civil War
United States federal civil rights legislation
1862 in American law
United States federal slavery legislation
19th-century American slaves
Military emancipation in the American Civil War